Andrew Leathem born  in Trafford, Greater Manchester, is an English former professional rugby league footballer.

References

External links
Profile at saints.org.uk

1977 births
Living people
English rugby league players
Leigh Leopards players
Rochdale Hornets players
Rugby articles needing expert attention
Rugby league players from Manchester
Rugby league props
St Helens R.F.C. players
Swinton Lions players
Warrington Wolves players